David John Leader Hawkins (born 3 March 1949) was the third area Bishop of Barking (8th Bishop of Barking) in the Church of England from 2002 to 2014.

Hawkins was educated at the University of Nottingham. After further study at St John's College, Nottingham he was ordained in 1974. He has a Bachelor of Theology (BTh).

His ordained ministry as a curate at St Andrew's Bebington, after which he was spent six years in Nigeria. He was then vicar of St George's Leeds for 16 years until his ordination to the episcopate. On 17 October 2002, at Southwark Cathedral, he was one (with Richard Cheetham and David Hamid) of the last three people to be ordained and consecrated a bishop by George Carey before his retirement as Archbishop of Canterbury. He was installed at Chelmsford Cathedral in January 2003 and retired on 30 March 2014.

A keen mountain walker, he is married with three children.

Styles
The Reverend David Hawkins (1974–1982)
The Reverend Canon David Hawkins (1982–2002)
The Right Reverend David Hawkins (2002—present)

References

1949 births
Alumni of the University of Nottingham
21st-century Church of England bishops
Living people
Bishops of Barking